Amarakunthi is a village in the Taramangalam Taluk in Salem District of Tamil Nadu, India.

Geography
Amarakunthi is located 29 km west of District headquarters in Salem, 9 km from Taramangalam and 338 km from the State capital Chennai.

Other nearby villages are Banapuram, Tholasampatti, Periyasoragai, U.maramangalam, and Nangavalli. Amarakunthi is bordered by Taramangalam to the south, Mecheri to the north, Omalur Taluk to the east, and Kadaiyampatty to the west.

Transport 
The two closest rail stations nearby are Tolasampatti and Mecheri Road. The closest major rail station is Salem Jn Rail Way Station 23 km away.

About Amaragundhi 

Amaragundhi is a village in Taramangalam Block in Salem District of Tamil Nadu State, India. It is located 27 km towards west from District headquarters Salem. 4 km from Taramangalam. 339 km from State capital Chennai

Amaragundhi Pin code is 636503 and postal head office is Tholasampatti.

Arurpatti ( 2 km ), Ramireddipatti ( 3 km ), Taramangalam ( 3 km ), Periyeripatti ( 3 km ), Chinnasoragai ( 4 km ) are the nearby Villages to Amaragundhi. Amaragundhi is surrounded by Nangavalli Block towards west, Mecheri Block towards North, Omalur Block towards East, Konganapuram Block towards South .

Tharamangalam, P.N.Patti, Salem, Sankari are the nearby Cities to Amaragundhi.

Amarakundhi 2011 Census Details 
Amaragundhi Local Language is Tamil. Amarakundhi Village Total population is 6100 and number of houses are 1567. Female Population is 47.2%. Village literacy rate is 60.0% and the Female Literacy rate is 24.2%.

Population 
Census Parameter	Census Data
Total Population	6100
Total No of Houses	1567
Female Population %	47.2% ( 2881)
Total Literacy rate %	60.0% ( 3663)
Female Literacy rate	24.2% ( 1475)
Scheduled Tribes Population %	0.0% ( 0)
Scheduled Caste Population %	5.6% ( 341)
Working Population %	42.9%
Child(0 -6) Population by 2011	644
Girl Child(0 -6) Population % by 2011	48.8% ( 314)

Amarakundhi Census More Details.

Politics in Amaragundhi 
DMK, AIADMK, TMC(M), PMK, ADMK are the major political parties in this area.

Polling Stations / Booths near Amaragundhi
1)Pums P Kalipatty 636455 
2)Pums Palakkaranoor(arurpatty) 636502 
3)Ghs M.olaipatti 636503 
4)Ghs Sedapatti(arurpatty) 636502 
5)Pues Velagoundanur 636455

HOW TO REACH Amaragundhi 
By Rail
Mecheri Road Rail Way Station, Omalur Junction Rail Way Station are the very nearby railway stations to Amaragundhi.

Temple 
 Meenakshi Sokanathar Temple, Periya Maariyamna Temple, Chinna Maariyaman Temple, Periyandichiamman Temple, Anjineyer Temple, Angalamman Temple, Sri Ramalinga Sowdeswari Amman temple

Villages in Salem district